Antonio A. del Rosario (born April 13, 1946) is a Filipino politician. A member of the Liberal Party, he served as governor of Capiz from 2016 to 2019, and was the representative of the 1st district of Capiz from 2007 to 2016. He served three terms as mayor of Roxas City from 1998 to 2007.

References

Notes

|-

1946 births
Living people
Members of the House of Representatives of the Philippines from Capiz
People from Capiz
Liberal Party (Philippines) politicians
Mayors of places in Capiz
Governors of Capiz